The 2002–03 Welsh Premier League was the 11th season of the Welsh Premier League since its establishment as the League of Wales in 1992. It began on 16 August 2002 and ended on 2 May 2003. The league was won for the third consecutive season by Barry Town, their seventh title.

League table

Results

References

Cymru Premier seasons
1
Wales